Alfred Illingworth (25 September 1827 – 1907), was an English worsted spinner and Liberal politician who sat in the House of Commons in two periods between 1868 and 1895.

Illingworth was born at Bradford, Yorkshire, the son of Daniel Illingworth and his wife Elizabeth Hill. He was educated at Huddersfield College and entered the family worsted spinning business of D Illingworth & Sons at the age of 16. In 1865, with his brother Henry, he established the Whetley Mills, one of the largest factories in Bradford. He was also a director of the Bradford District Bank. He had strong non-conformist and free trade views and entered into politics.

At the 1868 general election, Illingworth  was elected MP for  Knaresborough, but lost the seat in 1874. He was then elected at Bradford at the 1880 general election until the constituency was reorganised under the Redistribution of Seats Act 1885. At the 1885 general election  he was elected for Bradford West and held the seat until 1895.

He received the freedom of the city of Bradford on 24 October 1902, ″for eminent service rendered to the city during his career″.

Illingworth married Margaret Holden, daughter of Sir Isaac Holden, 1st Baronet in 1863 and his brother Henry married another daughter of Holden creating a strong alliance of two of the dominant Bradford families of the time. Henry was the father of Percy Illingworth and Albert Illingworth who were also active in politics in Yorkshire.

References

 Oxford Dictionary of National Biography D. T. Jenkins, ‘'Illingworth, Alfred (1827–1907)'’, 2004

External links 
 

1827 births
1907 deaths
Liberal Party (UK) MPs for English constituencies
UK MPs 1868–1874
UK MPs 1880–1885
UK MPs 1885–1886
UK MPs 1886–1892
UK MPs 1892–1895
Alfred
Members of Parliament for Bradford West